Lampbrush chromosome are a special form of chromosome found in the growing oocytes (immature eggs) of most animals, except mammals. They were first described by Walther Flemming and Ruckert in 1882. Lampbrush chromosomes of tailed and tailless amphibians, birds and insects are described best of all. Chromosomes transform into the lampbrush form during the diplotene stage of meiotic prophase I due to an active transcription of many genes. They are highly extended meiotic half-bivalents, each consisting of 2 sister chromatids. Lampbrush chromosomes are clearly visible even in the light microscope, where they are seen to be organized into a series of chromomeres with large chromatin loops extended laterally. Continuous RNA transcription is required to maintain typical chromomere-loop structure of lampbrush chromosomes. Inhibition of transcription leads to retraction of lateral loops into chromomeres and chromosome condensation.

Lampbrush chromosomes produce a large number of mRNAs and non-coding RNAs, which are synthesized on the lateral loops. These transcripts are used during oogenesis and at the early stages of embryogenesis. Each lateral loop contains one or several transcription units with polarized RNP-matrix coating the DNA axis of the loop. 

Amphibian and avian lampbrush chromosomes can be microsurgically isolated from oocyte nucleus (germinal vesicle) with either forceps or needles. Giant chromosomes in the lampbrush form are useful model for studying chromosome organization, genome function and gene expression during meiotic prophase, since they allow the individual transcription units to be visualized. Moreover, lampbrush chromosomes are widely used for high-resolution mapping of DNA sequences and construction of detail cytological maps of individual chromosomes.

References 
General
 Flemming W (1882) Zellsubstanz, Kern- und Zelltheilung. Vogel, Leipzig.
 Rückert J (1892) Zur Entwicklungsgeschichte des Ovarialeies bei Selachiern. Anat Anz 7: 107–158.
 Gall JG (1966) Techniques for the study of lampbrush chromosomes. In: Prescott DM (ed) Methods in cell physiology, vol II. Academic Press, London New York, pp 37–60.
Gall J.G., Callan H.G. H3 uridine incorporation in lampbrush chromosomes. Proc. Natl. Acad. Sci. USA. 1962. Vol. 48. P. 562–570.
 Callan HG (1986) Lampbrush Chromosomes.  Springer-Verlag, Berlin, Heidelberg. 252pp.
 Macgregor HC (1984) Lampbrush chromosomes and gene utilisation in meiotic prophase. In: Controlling Events in Meiosis, W. Evans and H.G.Dickinson (Editors). The Company of Biologists. P 333–348.
 Macgregor HC,  Varley J (1988) Working with Animal Chromosomes. 2nd edition. John Wiley & Sons.
 Morgan, G.T. (2002) Lampbrush chromosomes and associated bodies: new insights into principles of nuclear structure and function. Chromosome Research. 10: 177–200.
 Alberts, Johnson, Lewis, Raff, Roberts, Walter (2008), "Molecular biology of the cell" 5th edition. (p234–235).
 Gaginskaya E, Kulikova T, Krasikova A (2009) Avian Lampbrush Chromosomes: a Powerful Tool for Exploration of Genome Expression. Cytogenet Genome Res. V.124. P.251–267.
Macgregor H.C. Chromomeres revisited. Chromosome Res. 2012. V. 20. P. 911–924.
Chromosome Research - Special Issue (2012) "Lampbrush Chromosomes" Edited by Herbert Macgregor.

Specific

External links 

 A site introducing a remarkable form of chromosome that exists during the extended diplotene phase of meiosis in the growing ovarian eggs of all animals except mammals. Compiled and edited by Herbert Macgregor, School of Biosciences, University of Exeter.
 Methods for making lampbrush chromosome preparations from oocytes

Chromosomes